In the geologic timescale, the Homerian is an age of the Wenlock Epoch of the Silurian Period of the Paleozoic Era of the Phanerozoic Eon that is comprehended between 430.5 ± 0.7 Ma and 427.4 ± 0.5 Ma (million years ago), approximately. The Homerian Age succeeds the Sheinwoodian Age and precedes the Gorstian Age.

The name comes from the small village of Homer, Shropshire near Much Wenlock. The defining lower boundary of Homerian rock layers (GSSP) is located within the Coalbrookdale Formation of England.

References 

 
Wenlock epoch
Silurian geochronology